Taggart Hall is a late 18th-century residence that currently houses the Fort Mill Ridge Foundation and its Fort Mill Ridge Civil War Trenches museum, the Hampshire County Visitors Bureau, and the Hampshire County Chamber of Commerce. It is located in Romney, West Virginia, at 91 South High Street. Nextdoor to Taggart Hall on Gravel Lane stands Romney's oldest structure, the Wilson-Wodrow-Mytinger House (c. 1760).

Taggart Hall was constructed in the 1790s by Frances Taggart (Tygart), a Quaker, on a lot at the corner of High Street and Gravel Lane laid out in the original Romney survey conducted in 1762 on behalf of Thomas Fairfax, 6th Lord Fairfax of Cameron. Taggart Hall was originally built as a clapboard "half-house". The original eighteenth-century structure has been expanded to accommodate the Fort Mill Ridge Foundation, the Hampshire County Visitors Bureau, and the Hampshire County Chamber of Commerce.

See also
List of historic sites in Hampshire County, West Virginia

External links
 
Hampshire County Chamber of Commerce
Hampshire County Visitors Bureau

1790s establishments in Virginia
American Civil War museums in West Virginia
Buildings and structures in Romney, West Virginia
Hampshire County, West Virginia, in the American Civil War
Historic house museums in West Virginia
Houses completed in the 18th century
Houses in Hampshire County, West Virginia
Museums in Hampshire County, West Virginia
Tourism in West Virginia